The large moth subfamily Lymantriinae contains the following genera beginning with A:

References 

Lymantriinae
Lymantriid genera A